Gyanashree Mahathero, born 18 November 1925) is a Bangladeshi Buddhist guru who is the highest religious guru of the native Buddhists. The Government of Bangladesh awarded him the Ekushey Padak in 2022 for his significant contribution to social service.

Biography 
Gyanashree Mahathero was born on 18 November 1925 in the village of Domkhali, North Gujra, Raozan, Chittagong District. He has been staying at Nandankanan Buddhist Monastery in the Chittagong Hill Tracts since 1958.

Mahathero became a shramana in 1944 and a monk in 1949. He studied till the entrance. He took the initiative to spread the economic, social, religious and educational life of the Buddhist common people in the Chittagong Hill Tracts. He established many religious and educational institutions in the hilly and plain areas. In 1974, he set up a monastery, where residential schools were set up to provide general education to poor, orphaned and helpless Buddhist children. He established several Buddhist educational centers at Joypurhat and Rangpur.

Award 
Ekushey Padak (2022)

References 

1925 births
Living people
People from Chittagong District
Recipients of the Ekushey Padak